The Deserted Daughter is a 1795 comedy play by the British writer Thomas Holcroft.

The original Covent Garden cast included William Thomas Lewis as Cheveril, John Quick as Item, Alexander Pope as Mr Mordent, Joseph Shepherd Munden as Donald, George Davies Harley as Lennox, John Bernard as Grime, Isabella Mattocks as Mrs Sarsnet and Jane Pope as Lady Anne.

References

Bibliography
 Nicoll, Allardyce. A History of English Drama 1660–1900: Volume III. Cambridge University Press, 2009.
 Hogan, C.B (ed.) The London Stage, 1660–1800: Volume V. Southern Illinois University Press, 1968.

1795 plays
Comedy plays
West End plays
Plays by Thomas Holcroft